
Year 562 (DLXII) was a common year starting on Sunday (link will display the full calendar) of the Julian calendar. The denomination 562 for this year has been used since the early medieval period, when the Anno Domini calendar era became the prevalent method in Europe for naming years.

Events 
 By place 
 Byzantine Empire 
 Emperor Justinian I signs a peace treaty with the Persian Empire. The status quo ante is restored, with Lazica (modern Georgia) in Byzantine hands.
 Belisarius stands trial for corruption in Constantinople, possibly with Procopius acting as praefectus urbi. He is found guilty and sent to prison.
 End of the Lazic War: In the Fifty-Year Peace Treaty, King Khosrau I recognises Lazica as a Byzantine vassal state for an annual payment of 5,000 pounds of gold each year. 
 December 23 – Justinian I re-consecrates Hagia Sophia after its dome is rebuilt. Paul the Silentiary, Byzantine poet, writes an epic poem (Ekphrasis).
 The last Ostrogothic strongholds at Verona and Brixia are taken by the Eastern Roman Empire, ending the Gothic War.

 Europe 
 King Sigebert I repels an attack on Austrasia by the Avars at Regensburg (Germany). He moves his capital from Reims to Metz (approximate date).

 Asia 
 Spring – Xiao Ming Di, age 20, succeeds his father Xuan Di as emperor of the Chinese Liang Dynasty.
 Silla, by order of king Jinheung, wages war upon Gaya (Three Kingdoms of Korea) and conquers it.
 The secondary capital Taiyuan in Northern Qi is rebuilt and becomes a center of Buddhism.

 Mesoamerica 
 The Maya state of Caracol (Belize) defeats King Wak Chan K'awiil (Double Bird) of Tikal in battle during the First Tikal-Calakmul War, ending his dynasty.

Births

Deaths 
 Dowager Cao, concubine of Xuan Di
 Dowager Gong, empress mother of Xuan Di
 Procopius, Byzantine historian (approximate date)
 Xuan Di, emperor of the Liang Dynasty (b. 519)

References